Gold Star Publications was a British magazine publisher co-owned by David Gold with his brother Ralph. It included printing and distribution businesses, and a stable of titles including Rustler and Raider.

The business was formed in 1972 when Gold and David Sullivan merged their publishing interests.

The Gold brothers sold their interests in November 2006. In 2007, the brothers also sold their share in Sport Newspapers.

References 

1972 establishments in the United Kingdom
Magazine publishing companies of the United Kingdom